Luzy is a commune in the Nièvre department in central France.

Geography
The village is located in the middle of the commune, on the right bank of the river Alène.

Demographics

See also
Communes of the Nièvre department
Parc naturel régional du Morvan

References

External links

Official website 

Communes of Nièvre